Heikki Hedman (25 April 1940 – 3 April 2022) was a Finnish tennis player.

Tennis career
Hedman represented Finland in the Davis Cup competition during the period 1958 to 1969. He made his debut for the Finland team during the 1958 Europe Zone second round tie against Mexico, losing both his singles matches. His next appearance was six years later in the 1964 Europe Zone first round tie against Denmark. Hedman played six Davis Cup singles and three doubles rubbers, with only one victory in a doubles match. 

In 1969 Hedman founded TennisHedman, a tennis school in Helsinki.

See also
List of Finland Davis Cup team representatives

References

External links 
 
 

1940 births
2022 deaths 
Finnish male tennis players
Finnish tennis coaches
Finnish sports broadcasters